SS Cape Girardeau (T-AK 2039) is a Modular Cargo Delivery System (MCDS) ship in the National Defense Reserve Fleet. The ship is named for Cape Girardeau, Missouri.

Commercial service 
SS Cape Girardeau (ON: 517717) was a Maritime Administration (MARAD) type C5-S-75A hull. It was laid down on 21 August 1967 as the break-bulk freighter SS Alaskan Mail. Built by Newport News Shipbuilding (hull no. 587) under MARAD contract (MA-215), she was delivered on 29 October 1968 and began service with American Mail Line.

In 1973, American President Line, Ltd. purchased American Mail Line and continued operating the ship, changing its name to SS President Adams in 1978.

In order to maintain profitability of the ship, American President Lines sent President Adams for overhaul and modernization, which converted the ship from a type 01 (break-bulk) freighter to a type 58 (partial containerized) freighter. This allowed the ship to carry 332 TEU's as well as 1,082,207 cu ft. of bulk cargo on board.

In January, 1984, President Adams was transferred to the Military Sealift Command (MSC)  for a three-year charter, after which she was returned to American President Lines.

Federal service 
A year after her three-year lease to the Military Sealift Command, American President Lines transferred the ship permanently to the MARAD in April, 1988. She was then renamed SS Cape Girardeau, and designated T-AK 2039.

As a MARAD ship, Cape Girardeau was homeported in Alameda, CA as part of the Ready Reserve Force.In October 1989, Cape Girardeau was sent for a 3-month drydock maintenance period. Just a year later, she would be activated by the Military Sealift Command for service in Operation Desert Storm.

During Desert Storm, she was assigned to Rear Admiral Stephen Clarey's Amphibious Group 3, carrying supplies in support of the 5th Marine Expeditionary Brigade. She returned home to Suisun Bay on 19 November 1991.

In the following years, she sat in the Reserve Fleet undergoing occasional activation drills and maintenance availabilities.

Upon successful completion of MCDS OPS WESTEX, Cape Girardeau returned home to Alameda.

In 2002, she underwent an activation to test the reserve force readiness.

2004 saw the Cape Girardeau activated for RIMPAC, which saw  replenishing US and allied ships to increase interoperability, and to test the ship's delivery systems.

In 2008, the ship underwent a final dry dock period at BAE in San Francisco, before being transferred to the Suisun Bay Reserve Fleet for Ready Reserve Force lay-up in July. On 23 October, she was stricken from the Naval Register. Cape Girardeau was downgraded to Emergency Sealift status in 2009.

References 

National Defense Reserve Fleet
Cape Girardeau County, Missouri
Gulf War ships of the United States
1968 ships